Michael Anthony Angarano (born December 3, 1987) is an American actor. He became known for his roles in the film Music of the Heart (1999) and the television series Cover Me (2000–2001), as well as for playing a recurring role as Elliott in the sitcom Will & Grace. Since then he has starred in a number of films including Sky High (2005), The Forbidden Kingdom (2008), Haywire (2011), The English Teacher (2013), and Sun Dogs (2017). He has also appeared in the television series I'm Dying Up Here (2017–2018) and This Is Us. The latter earned him a Primetime Emmy Award nomination as an Outstanding Guest Actor in a Drama Series in 2019.

Early life
Angarano was born in Brooklyn, New York, to Michael and Doreen Angarano; he has two sisters and a younger brother. He is of Italian descent.

His family owns and operates the dance studio Reflections in Dance in Canoga Park, California. Angarano graduated from Crespi Carmelite High School.

Career
In the late 1990s, Angarano was one of the finalists for the role of young Anakin Skywalker in Star Wars: Episode I – The Phantom Menace, but lost to Jake Lloyd.

Angarano played the 11-year-old version of William Miller in Cameron Crowe's semi-autobiographical film Almost Famous in 2000.

In 2000, 12-year-old Angarano acted in Cover Me: Based on the True Life of an FBI Family. The following year, he landed his first major film role in Little Secrets, opposite Evan Rachel Wood and David Gallagher. Three years later, he starred in the Nickelodeon TV-movie Maniac Magee. He played the lead role in 2005's Sky High alongside Kelly Preston, Kurt Russell, Danielle Panabaker, and Mary Elizabeth Winstead. Other film roles include parts in The Bondage, Black Irish, Man in the Chair, Snow Angels, The Final Season, One Last Thing..., The Forbidden Kingdom alongside Jackie Chan and Jet Li, Ceremony, The Brass Teapot, and Red State.

Angarano did not study martial arts before starring in The Forbidden Kingdom with Jackie Chan and Jet Li. Once cast he studied in China for eight hours a day for two weeks with action choreographer Woo-Ping Yuen. Over the seven months of shooting his skills and confidence grew. Angarano's fight scenes were filmed during the last 35 days of shooting.

On television, from 2001 to 2006, he had a recurring role on Will & Grace as Elliott, the son of Jack McFarland, a role he reprised in an episode of the show's 2017 reboot. In 2007, he appeared in four episodes of the show 24 as Scott Wallace, a teenager taken hostage by a terrorist. From 2014 to 2015, he played Dr. Bertram "Bertie" Chickering, Jr. on Cinemax's period drama The Knick. Angarano has also played Eddie Zeidel on the Showtime series I'm Dying Up Here.

Personal life
From 2005 to early 2009, Angarano was in a relationship with American actress Kristen Stewart. He then dated English actress Juno Temple from 2013 to 2016. 

In September 2019, he confirmed his relationship with American actress Maya Erskine. On November 2, 2020, the couple revealed that they were engaged and expecting a child. Their son, Leon Frederick, was born in 2021.

Filmography

Film

Television

References

External links 

 
 
 UltimateDisney.com Interview – November 2005
 

1987 births
Living people
20th-century American male actors
21st-century American male actors
American male child actors
American male film actors
American male television actors
Male actors from Los Angeles
Male actors from New York City
American people of Italian descent
People from Brooklyn